William Lawrence Smith (born September 2, 1947) is an American former college and professional football player who was a running back in the National Football League (NFL) for six seasons during the 1960s and 1970s.  Smith played college football for the University of Florida, and earned All-American honors.  He was a first-round pick in the 1969 NFL Draft, and played professionally for the Los Angeles Rams and Washington Redskins of the NFL.

Early life 

Smith was born in 1947 in Tampa, Florida, and attended Thomas Richard Robinson High School in Tampa.  As a junior in 1963, Smith was the star running back on the Robinson Knights high school football team, and led his team to Florida's first-ever state championship football game before losing to the Coral Gables Cavaliers 16–14.  He finished his high school career with forty-seven touchdowns, and received all-county, all-state, and Parade magazine high school All-American accolades.  In 2007, forty-two years after he graduated from high school, the Florida High School Athletic Association (FHSAA) recognized Smith as one of the "100 Greatest Players of the First 100 Years" of Florida high school football.

College career 

Smith accepted an athletic scholarship to attend the University of Florida in Gainesville, Florida, where he was a tailback for coach Ray Graves' Florida Gators football team from 1966 to 1968.  Memorably, Smith had a 94-yard touchdown run in the Gators' 27–12 victory over the Georgia Tech Yellow Jackets in the 1967 Orange Bowl—while struggling to keep his pants up.  His 187 yards rushing in the Orange Bowl resulted in him being named the game's "Outstanding Player."  He finished his college football career with 528 carries for 2,186 yards and twenty-four rushing touchdowns, and 607 yards receiving. He was a first-team All-Southeastern Conference (SEC) selection in 1966, 1967 and 1968, and was a first-team All-American in 1968.  Smith was also the recipient of the Gators' Fergie Ferguson Award, recognizing the "senior football player who displays outstanding leadership, character and courage."

Smith graduated from Florida with a bachelor's degree in business administration in 1970, and was inducted into the University of Florida Athletic Hall of Fame as a "Gator Great" in 1983.  In a 2006 article series written for The Gainesville Sun, he was recognized as No. 29 among the top 100 Gator players from the first 100 years of Florida football.

Professional career 

His rookie year with the Rams was his most productive season: 599 yards rushing and 300 yards receiving. He received few carries with the Redskins, however, accumulating only 149 yards in seven games, with no touchdowns. In his six NFL seasons, Smith gained 2,057 yards rushing on 528 carries for eleven touchdowns; he also had 149 receptions for 1,176 yards receiving and five touchdowns.

Life after football 

Smith returned to the University of Florida to earn a master's degree in business administration in 1975.  In 1982, he graduated from the Stetson University College of Law with a J.D. degree, and is now a commercial real estate attorney with the Tampa law firm of Hill, Ward & Henderson.

Smith is married, and he and his wife have two daughters and a son.

See also 

 1968 College Football All-America Team
 Florida Gators football, 1960–69
 List of Florida Gators football All-Americans
 List of Florida Gators in the NFL Draft
 List of Los Angeles Rams first-round draft picks
 List of Los Angeles Rams players
 List of University of Florida alumni
 List of University of Florida Athletic Hall of Fame members
 List of Washington Redskins players

References

Bibliography 

 Carlson, Norm, University of Florida Football Vault: The History of the Florida Gators, Whitman Publishing, LLC, Atlanta, Georgia (2007).  .
 Golenbock, Peter, Go Gators!  An Oral History of Florida's Pursuit of Gridiron Glory, Legends Publishing, LLC, St. Petersburg, Florida (2002).  .
 Hairston, Jack, Tales from the Gator Swamp: A Collection of the Greatest Gator Stories Ever Told, Sports Publishing, LLC, Champaign, Illinois (2002).  .
 McCarthy, Kevin M.,  Fightin' Gators: A History of University of Florida Football, Arcadia Publishing, Mount Pleasant, South Carolina (2000).  .
 McEwen, Tom, The Gators: A Story of Florida Football, The Strode Publishers, Huntsville, Alabama (1974).  .
 Nash, Noel, ed., The Gainesville Sun Presents The Greatest Moments in Florida Gators Football, Sports Publishing, Inc., Champaign, Illinois (1998).  .

1947 births
Living people
All-American college football players
American football running backs
Florida Gators football players
Florida lawyers
Los Angeles Rams players
Players of American football from Tampa, Florida
Washington Redskins players